Cinemagic Theater is a theater in Portland, Oregon.

References

External links
 
 

Buckman, Portland, Oregon
Theatres in Portland, Oregon